Martin Mathew "Marty" Dolin (June 15, 1939 – February 14, 2018) was an American-born Canadian politician in Manitoba, Canada.  He was a member of the Legislative Assembly of Manitoba from 1985 to 1988, representing the north-end Winnipeg riding of Kildonan as a member of the New Democratic Party of Manitoba.

Dolin was educated at the City College of New York, the University of the Americas in Mexico, and Dalhousie University in Nova Scotia. In the Canadian federal election of 1972, he ran as a New Democratic Party candidate in Halifax, finishing third against Progressive Conservative Party leader Robert Stanfield and Liberal Terry McGrath. At the time, Dolin was employed as an executive director for family services.

He also ran for the New Democratic Party of Nova Scotia in the provincial election of 1974, finishing third against Liberal Premier Gerald Regan in the riding of Halifax Needham.

Dolin moved to Manitoba, where his wife Mary Beth Dolin served as a cabinet minister in the government of Howard Pawley in the early 1980s. Following Mary Beth's death in 1985, he successfully ran to succeed her as the MLA for Kildonan, defeating Tory Bev Rayburn by over 1,000 votes. He was re-elected over Rayburn by a greater margin in the 1986 provincial election, though he was not appointed to Pawley's cabinet.

In the 1988 election, Dolin finished third in a close race against Progressive Conservative John Baluta and winning Liberal Gulzar Singh Cheema. He retired from public office and never attempted a political comeback.

In 1994, he published a work entitled Education in a Multicultural Society.

After leaving politics, Dolin was a member of the Canadian Council for Refugees, the Interfaith Immigration Council (he himself is Jewish), and the Social Planning Council for the City of Winnipeg. He retired in June 2011 as head of Welcome Place, Manitoba's largest refugee-settlement agency. In 2012, he was presented with the Queen Elizabeth II Diamond Jubilee Medal for his public service for refugees.

Electoral record

References

New Democratic Party of Manitoba MLAs
1939 births
2018 deaths
American emigrants to Canada
20th-century American Jews
City College of New York alumni
Dalhousie University alumni
Jewish Canadian politicians
New Democratic Party candidates for the Canadian House of Commons
Politicians from New York City
Writers from New York City
21st-century American Jews